Diamond Mountain National Forest was established as the Diamond Mountain Forest Reserve by the U.S. Forest Service in California on July 14, 1905  with .  It became a National Forest on March 4, 1907. On July 1, 1908 a portion of Diamond Mountain was transferred to Plumas National Forest and the remainder to Lassen National Forest. The name was discontinued.

References

External links
Forest History Society
Listing of the National Forests of the United States and Their Dates (from the Forest History Society website) Text from Davis, Richard C., ed. Encyclopedia of American Forest and Conservation History. New York: Macmillan Publishing Company for the Forest History Society, 1983. Vol. II, pp. 743-788.

Former National Forests of California
Plumas National Forest